The 2002 Humboldt State Lumberjacks football team represented Humboldt State University during the 2002 NCAA Division II football season. Humboldt State competed in the Great Northwest Athletic Conference (GNAC).

The 2002 Lumberjacks were led by third-year head coach Doug Adkins. They played home games at the Redwood Bowl in Arcata, California. Humboldt State finished the season with a record of one win and ten losses (1–10, 0–3 GNAC). The Lumberjacks were outscored by their opponents 182–376 for the 2002 season.

Schedule

Notes

References

Humboldt State
Humboldt State Lumberjacks football seasons
Humboldt State Lumberjacks football